Frankie and Johnny is a 1991 American romantic comedy-drama film directed by Garry Marshall and starring Al Pacino and Michelle Pfeiffer in their first film together since Scarface (1983). Héctor Elizondo, Nathan Lane, and Kate Nelligan appear in supporting roles. The original score was composed by Marvin Hamlisch.

The screenplay for Frankie and Johnny was adapted by Terrence McNally from his own off-Broadway play Frankie and Johnny in the Clair de Lune (1987), which featured F. Murray Abraham and Kathy Bates. The most notable alteration in the film was the addition of several supporting characters and various locations; in the original play, only the two eponymous characters appeared onstage, and the entire drama took place in one apartment.

The title is a reference to the traditional American popular song "Frankie and Johnny", first published in 1904, which tells the story of a woman who finds her man making love to another woman and shoots him dead. The film received generally favorable reviews and grossed $67 million with a $29 million budget.

Plot
An emotionally scarred waitress named Frankie attends her godson's baptism in Altoona, Pennsylvania. Meanwhile, a middle-aged man named Johnny is released from prison. Frankie returns home to New York City to her job waitressing at the Apollo Cafe. The owner, Nick, sends her co-worker Helen home early after she complains of dizziness. Johnny arrives looking for work and Nick hires him as a short-order cook despite his criminal record. After work, Frankie returns home to her apartment to find a stranger, Bobby, installing shelves, but he is revealed to be the boyfriend of her friend and neighbor, Tim. That night, Johnny solicits a prostitute, but merely asks her to lie clothed in bed with him.

The next day, Nick announces to his staff that Helen has been hospitalized. Frankie and her co-worker Cora visit an unconscious Helen and share their fears of dying alone like her. The next day, after helping a man who had an epileptic seizure, Johnny asks Frankie out on a date, but she refuses. Helen dies and Frankie, Cora, and fellow waitress Nedda are surprised to see Johnny at her funeral. Back at work, Johnny asks Frankie out again. After she refuses again, he has a one-night stand with Cora, which she shares the details of with Frankie and Nedda.

Weeks pass, and Johnny asks Frankie to be his date at a co-worker's going-away party, but she again refuses. He shows up at her apartment anyway, where Bobby and Tim help Frankie decide what to wear. At the party, Johnny attempts to convince Frankie that they are a good match. After the party, he buys her a flower and persuades her to take him back to her apartment, where they spend an intimate night together.

Now convinced that they are meant to be together, Johnny shows up at her bowling night and professes his love to her. Frankie argues that he cannot love her after such a short period of time, and reveals that she cannot have children after Johnny mentions starting a family. Afterwards, Frankie avoids Johnny, not answering his phone calls and switching her shifts. However, Johnny switches his shifts too and they talk to each other. Johnny confesses that he is divorced and has two children whom he has not seen since he got out of prison for check fraud. Frankie encourages him to see them, and she confesses that her last boyfriend cheated on her with her best friend.

After work, Johnny walks Frankie to her apartment, where they discuss their lives and listen to "Clair de lune". However, the intimacy makes Frankie uncomfortable and they argue. She asks him to leave, but before he does, he calls the radio station and asks them to play an encore of "Clair de lune". Frankie confesses that a previous boyfriend had physically abused her, at one point causing her to have a miscarriage which made her unable to have children. Frankie invites Johnny to stay and they watch the sunrise together.

Cast

Production
Star Trek VI: The Undiscovered Country was filming in a nearby studio, and Garry Marshall arranged for the actors William Shatner (James T. Kirk), Leonard Nimoy (Spock) and DeForest Kelley (Leonard Mccoy) to appear fully costumed, out of camera shot, behind a door in one scene in order to elicit genuine surprise from Al Pacino when he opened it.

Reception
On Rotten Tomatoes, Frankie and Johnny the film holds an approval rating of 69% based on 35 reviews, with an average rating of 6.7/10.

Peter Travers in Rolling Stone wrote: "there hasn't been a sharper, sassier, more touching romantic comedy this year... there's no denying Marshall's expert timing. This is the director's best work yet... In its celebration of cautious optimism, Frankie and Johnny becomes the perfect love story for these troubled times." Janet Maslin in The New York Times wrote: "in the skillfully manipulative hands of Garry Marshall, who has directed from a screenplay by Mr. McNally that amounts to a complete revision, Frankie and Johnny has been reshaped into foolproof schmaltz. 'Foolproof' is the operative word... But somehow Mr. Marshall, Mr. McNally and their superb leading actors are able to retain the intimacy of their material. They also retain the story's fundamental wariness about romance, even when everything about Ms. Pfeiffer and Mr. Pacino has the audience wondering why they don't simply fall into each other's arms." Rita Kempley in The Washington Post wrote: "In its odyssey from stage to screen, Frankie & Johnny has undergone a sunny metamorphosis from ugly ducklings' romance to candy-coated, blue-collar valentine." Time Out summed it up thus: "Pacino wears a vest and bandanna and moons through the part. Pfeiffer plays dowdy. Marshall directs as if Marty had never happened."

Much attention was paid to the controversial casting choices of Al Pacino and Michelle Pfeiffer, two actors perceived as "beautiful movie stars" with Hollywood glamour, cast to play "lonely little people struggling to find love," originated by supposed "ordinary" actors Kenneth Welsh and Kathy Bates. Stephen Farber in Movieline wrote: "Michelle Pfeiffer gives a very adept and winning performance in Frankie & Johnny, but she's simply wrong for the part of a plain, world-weary waitress. While Pfeiffer has protested to interviewers that physical beauty cannot guarantee happiness, the fact remains that anyone as gorgeous as she is has a lot more options than someone who looks like Kathy Bates (who originated the role on stage). The star casting robs the material of some of its poignancy." The Washington Post wrote that "casting Michelle Pfeiffer in a role written for Kathy Bates is going to have a definite effect on the story's dramatic weight. That's not to say that Pfeiffer isn't pfantastic or that this isn't the pfeel-good movie of the season. It's just ... well, imagine Kevin Costner as Marty." Variety asserted that no one would "believe that Pfeiffer hasn't had a date since Ronald Reagan was president, and no matter how hard she tries to look plain, there is no disguising that she just gets more beautiful all the time."

However, some critics commended Pfeiffer for her performance, notably Rolling Stone, who called it "a triumph. She is among that rarefied group of actresses (Anjelica Huston, Meryl Streep) whose work keeps taking us by surprise. Her powerfully subtle acting can tickle the funny bone or pierce the heart with equally uncanny skill." The New York Times wrote that "Ms. Pfeiffer's extraordinary beauty makes her fine-tuned, deeply persuasive performance as the tough and fearful Frankie that much more surprising."

Pacino also received critical praise. Rolling Stone wrote: "Pacino, whose recent work has been lugubrious (The Godfather Part III) or broad (Dick Tracy), shows a real flair for comic delicacy." The New York Times wrote that "Mr. Pacino has not been this uncomplicatedly appealing since his Dog Day Afternoon days, and he makes Johnny's endless enterprise in wooing Frankie a delight. His scenes alone with Ms. Pfeiffer have a precision and honesty that keep the film's maudlin aspects at bay." Variety, however, described him as "a warm, slobbering dog who can't leave people alone, Pacino's Johnny comes on real strong, and his pronounced neediness is too much at times."

Kate Nelligan was singled out for her supporting turn; The New York Times wrote that "Kate Nelligan, nearly unrecognizable, is outstandingly enjoyable as the gum-chewing, man-crazy one." Rolling Stone thought that "seeing this Royal Shakespeare Company actress cut loose with this bold and brassy performance is one of the film's zippiest treats."

The film grossed $22.8 million in the United States and Canada and $44.2 million overseas for a worldwide gross of $67 million.

Awards and nominations

Other honors
The film is recognized by American Film Institute in these lists:
 2002: AFI's 100 Years...100 Passions – Nominated

Notes

References

External links

 
 
 
 
 

1991 films
1991 comedy-drama films
1991 LGBT-related films
1991 romantic comedy films
1991 romantic drama films
1990s English-language films
1990s romantic comedy-drama films
American films based on plays
American LGBT-related films
American romantic comedy-drama films
Films about couples
Films directed by Garry Marshall
Films scored by Marvin Hamlisch
Films set in New York City
Films shot in New York City
Films with screenplays by Terrence McNally
LGBT-related romantic comedy-drama films
Paramount Pictures films
1990s American films